Al-Wajihiya Sport Club, is an Iraqi football team based in Diyala, that plays in Iraq Division Three.

Managerial history
 Mohammed Hassan Jarallah

See also 
 2020–21 Iraq FA Cup

References

External links
 Al-Wajihiya SC on Goalzz.com
 Iraq Clubs- Foundation Dates

Football clubs in Iraq
2004 establishments in Iraq
Association football clubs established in 2004
Football clubs in Diyala